Asaphocrita is a genus of moths in the family Blastobasidae.

Species

Asaphocrita alogiae
Asaphocrita amatricis
Asaphocrita animulae
Asaphocrita aphidiella
Asaphocrita arcis
Asaphocrita aulae
Asaphocrita aurae
Asaphocrita blattae
Asaphocrita busckiella
Asaphocrita catenae
Asaphocrita cenae
Asaphocrita collyrae
Asaphocrita coronae
Asaphocrita deae
Asaphocrita erae
Asaphocrita estriatella
Asaphocrita fidei
Asaphocrita furciferae
Asaphocrita fuscopurpurella
Asaphocrita gazae
Asaphocrita gerrulae
Asaphocrita irenica
Asaphocrita laminae
Asaphocrita lucis
Asaphocrita lunae
Asaphocrita magae
Asaphocrita maximae
Asaphocrita obsoletella
Asaphocrita opellae
Asaphocrita pallae
Asaphocrita pineae (Amsel, 1962)
Asaphocrita plagiatella
Asaphocrita planetae
Asaphocrita plummerella
Asaphocrita protypica
Asaphocrita quietis
Asaphocrita rationis
Asaphocrita reginae
Asaphocrita sciaphilella
Asaphocrita spei
Asaphocrita stellae
Asaphocrita umbrae
Asaphocrita viraginis
Asaphocrita vitae

References

 
Blastobasidae genera